The 2018–19 Women's Belgian Hockey League was the 94th season of the Women's Belgian Hockey League, the top women's Belgian field hockey league.

The season started on 2 September 2018 and concluded on 12 May 2019 with the second match of the championship final.

Format
The season was played with a total of twelve teams. Two pools of six were formed, based on rankings from the previous season.

Pool A: 1, 4, 5, 8, 9, National 1 (Team 2)

Pool B: 2, 3, 6, 7, 10, National 1 (Team 1)

Teams in each pool played each other twice throughout the season, while playing teams from the other pool once. At the conclusion of the pool stage, the top four teams from each pool advanced to the play–offs, while the remaining teams moved forward to the relegation matches.

Teams

Number of teams by provinces

Regular season

Pool A

Pool B

Results
The following results represent the crossover matches between pools A and B.

Play–downs

Play–offs

Bracket

Quarter-finals

Antwerp won the series 3–0 in a shoot-out, following a 4–4 tie on aggregate.

Leuven won the series 2–0.

Racing won the series 3–2 in a shoot-out, following a 3–3 tie on aggregate.

Braxgata won the series 4–3 on aggregate.

Fifth to eighth place classification

Crossover

Seventh and eighth place

Fifth and sixth place

First to fourth place classification

Semi-finals

Antwerp won the series 4–3 in a shoot-out, following a 3–3 tie on aggregate.

Racing won the series 5–3 on aggregate.

Third and fourth place

Final

Antwerp won the series 2–0, claiming the national title.

References

Belgian Hockey League
Hockey League
Hockey League